{{Infobox person
| name = Georgii Cherkin| image = https://yt3.ggpht.com/-TLbBU1yZAsQ/AAAAAAAAAAI/AAAAAAAAAAA/1DqU1Me7XGA/s900-c-k-no/photo.jpg
| caption = 
| birth_date = 
| birth_place = Sofia, Bulgaria
| occupation = Pianist, song writer
| known_for = Renditions of Beethoven's notable works
}}Georgii Cherkin''' (born 2 July 1977) is a Bulgarian pianist.

Biography 

Cherkin was born in Sofia, Bulgaria in a family with a great music tradition (his grandfather Georgi Zlatev-Cherkin was a famous Bulgarian composer and vocal pedagogue). He started playing the piano and composing at the age of six, and the following year he enrolled in the Liubomir Pipkov National Music School in Sofia, where he was a student of Antonina Boneva. In 1996, he was admitted to the Pancho Vladiguerov State Music Academy in Sofia in Prof. Atanas Kurtev's class. A year later, he was also admitted at the prestigious Accademia di Santa Cecilia in Rome, where he was trained by one of the most renowned music professors in Italy, Sergio Perticaroli, graduating cum laude. 
  
He has performed as a soloist with symphony orchestras more than 100 times, and played in many prestigious concert halls, such as the Auditorio Hall in Rome, Musikhalle in Hamburg, Convention Center in Okinawa, Seoul Arts Center, Palais des Beaux Arts in Brussels, Invalides Hall in Paris, Kaufmann Concert Hall in New York to name a few. During the past few years, he has been awarded numerous prizes for popularizing culture and art in Bulgaria, including "The Crystal Lire", "The Golden Century", "The Golden Muse", and "The Golden Quill" among others. He has also won top prizes at the following international competitions – Pancho Vladigerov in 2003, Premio Sassari (Italy) in 1999, and Young Musical Talents in Sofia, 1994. 
  
Cherkin's repertoire includes more than 25 concertos for piano and orchestra, including all the concertos by Rachmaninoff and the most difficult ones of the romantic period, which he has performed as a soloist of the Sofia Philharmonic, the Symphony Orchestra of the Bulgarian National Radio, Classic FM Orchestra, Santa Cecilia Orchestra, Incheon Philharmonic Orchestra, Orquestra de Câmara de Cascais e Oeiras, National Radio Orchestra of Romania, and Bilkent Symphony Orchestra, under the batons of Emil Tabakov, Georgi Dimitrov, Milen Nachev, Horia Andreescu, Francesco La Vecchia, Shungo Moriyama, Ovidiu Balan, Miguel Grassa–Mora and many others. His concert schedule during recent years has included a series of very successful piano recitals in Rome, Paris, Berlin, Brussels, New York, Seoul, Warsaw, Prague, Sofia, and Bratislava. 
  
Since a young age Cherkin has also been composing & orchestrating music for the symphony orchestra. He has made numerous orchestrations of famous piano pieces, arranged for piano & orchestra, including Für Elise by Beethoven, The Moonlight Piano Sonata No. 14 (Beethoven), The Seasons (Tchaikovsky), and The Turkish March from Piano Sonata No. 11 (Mozart). All these pieces were performed in a World Premiere with Classic FM Orchestra in "Bulgaria Hall" with Live TV & Radio broadcasting. Mr. Cherkin has also composed and arranged music for films, drama, and other classical music projects.

External links 
 Für Elise by Beethoven for Piano & Orchestra Arranged by Georgii Cherkin
 Moonlight Sonata by Beethoven for Piano & Orchestra Arranged by Georgii Cherkin
 The Seasons by Tchaikovsky for Piano & Orchestra Arranged by Georgii Cherkin
 Rondo alla turca (Turkish march) by Mozart for Piano & Strings Arranged by Georgii Cherkin

References 

Bulgarian pianists
Living people
1977 births
Musicians from Sofia
21st-century pianists